Electric Moon is a 1992 Indian film directed by Pradip Krishen and written by Arundhati Roy. The film was produced by Grapevine Media for Channel 4 Television and Bobby Bedi's Kaleidoscope Entertainment and was reviewed at the International Film Festival of India (IFFI) and the 36th London Film Festival (1992).

At the 40th National Film Awards, the film won the award for Best Feature Film in English.

Set in an expensive tourist lodge in the forests of central India run by former royalty, Raja Ran Bikram Singh, 'Bubbles', the film is a satirical parody on Westerners visiting India, in search for their stereotypical notions of the country, replete with images of former Indian royalty, and relics of the British Raj. In turn the film was a commentary on social pretense and ecology. The issue was previously taken up by the Merchant-Ivory film The Guru (1969), and in time the film acquired a cult following.

In a 2005 interview, Roy said,  "The movie I had in my head and  different from the one we shot. I wanted it to  have a more anarchic quality, but I didn't know enough about cinema  to make that come through on screen."

Cast
 Roshan Seth - Ranveer
 Naseeruddin Shah - Rambuhj Goswami
 Leela Naidu - Sukanya 'Socks'
 Gerson Da Cunha - Raja Ran Bikram Singh, 'Bubbles'
 Raghuvir Yadav - Boltu 
 Alice Spivak - Louise Robinson
 Frances Helm - Emma Lane
 James Fleet - Simon Lidell
 Gareth Forwood - Ian
 Malcolm Jamieson - Thierry

References

External links
 

1992 films
English-language Indian films
British Indian films
Indian satirical films
Films set in India
Best English Feature Film National Film Award winners
British television films
Films directed by Pradip Krishen
1990s English-language films